Bucke is a surname. Notable people with this surname include:

 Charles Bucke (1781–1846), English writer
 Patrick De Bucke (born 1957), Belgian sprint canoer
 Richard Maurice Bucke (1837–1902), Canadian psychiatrist

See also
 Buck (surname)